Jewboy is a 2005 Australian film directed by Tony Krawitz. The film stars Ewen Leslie, Chris Haywood,  Saskia Burmeister, and Nicholas Eadie. It won the 2005 Australian Film Institute Awards for Best Short Fiction Film, Best Cinematography and Best Screenplay in a Short.

Plot
The film tells of a young Orthodox Jewish man's struggle after the death of his father. The young man returns from Israel to find that he would prefer to leave Orthodoxy, and departs from his remaining family to become a taxi driver.  He gradually assimilates into secular life, soon finding himself tempted to fornicate.

The film appears to mimic the Parable of the Prodigal Son, with the main character appearing to reconsider Orthodox life at the end of the film by reuniting with his family.

Release
The film showed in the Un Certain Regard at the 2005 Cannes Film Festival, as well as in official selection in the 2006 Sundance Film Festival. After the presentation, Tony Krawitz, the Jewish director, and Ewen Leslie (who is not Jewish) responded to various questions, claiming that the title was not meant to be offensive, and the film had been prescreened by a Jewish audience to positive reviews.

Cast

 Ewen Leslie – Yuri
 Naomi Wilson – Minnie
 Saskia Burmeister – Rivka
 Leah Vandenberg – Sarita
 Nicholas Eadie – Isaac
 Chris Haywood – Sam
 Nathan Besser – Alon
 Alice McConnell – Cheryl
 Nicholas Calafato – Jew Boy
 Kelly Butler – Woman in Taxi
 Alan Flower – STA Passenger
 Richard Green – Gary
 Jake Stone – Yossi
 Sky Tse – Chinese Man
 Adam Rosenberg – Dovid
 Shivani Dewan – Nina

Box office
Jewboy grossed $19,118 at the box office in Australia.

See also
Cinema of Australia

References

External links

Jewboy at the National Film and Sound Archive
 official website

2005 films
Australian drama short films
2005 drama films
Films about Jews and Judaism
Films produced by Liz Watts
2000s English-language films
2000s Australian films